Olof Rydbeck (15 April 1913 – 23 December 1995) was a Swedish diplomat, head of Sveriges Radio between 1955 and 1970, Sweden's ambassador to the UN, and a Commissioner-General of UNRWA.

Early life
Rydbeck was born on 15 April 1913 in Djursholm, Sweden. He was the son of bank manager Oscar Rydbeck and Signe Olsson. He married Monica Schnell in 1940.

Education
Rydbeck finished a bachelor's degree in 1934 and a master's degree in 1936 at Uppsala University

Career and later life
Rydbeck served in Sweden's first mission to the UN, led by Östen Undén. In 1952, he was appointed to the Foreign Ministry's press officer. In 1955, Rydbeck left the diplomatic service and became Director-General of Sveriges Radio (the Swedish national broadcasting organization), a position which he held for fifteen years. In 1970 Rydbeck returned to the diplomatic service and represented Sweden at the UN in New York from 1970 to 1976. During this time he was appointed by the Secretary General to negotiate Western Sahara's future. From 1976 to 1979, he was ambassador to the U.K. Rydbeck served as UNRWA Commissioner-General from 1979 to 1985.

In 1990, Olof Rydbeck published his memoirs, I maktens närhet. Diplomat, radiochef, FN-ämbetsman (In the vicinity of power. Diplomat, radio chief, UN officer).

Rydbeck died on December 23, 1995 in Stocksund, Sweden.

See also
 List of Directors and Commissioners-General of the United Nations Relief and Works Agency for Palestine Refugees in the Near East

Sources
 Olof Rydbeck, I maktens närhet. Diplomat, radiochef, FN-ämbetsman, Bonnier 1990.

References

UNRWA officials
1995 deaths
1913 births
Permanent Representatives of Sweden to the United Nations
Ambassadors of Sweden to the United Kingdom
Uppsala University alumni
Commanders Crosses of the Order of Merit of the Federal Republic of Germany
Swedish officials of the United Nations